Leonard Marconi (Warsaw, 6 October 1835 – 1 April 1899, Lviv) was a Polish and Austro-Hungarian architect and sculptor. He was active chiefly at Warsaw, then in Galicia, notably at Lwów (now Lviv, Ukraine).

Life
Leonard Marconi was born on 6 October 1835 in Warsaw to a well-known artistic family of Italian origin. He was the son of sculptor Ferrante Marconi, nephew of architect Henryk Marconi, and cousin of Leandro Marconi, a famed architect. He graduated from the Academy of Fine Arts in Warsaw, then the Accademia di San Luca in Rome.

In 1861 he returned to Poland and opened an atelier in Warsaw. Fairly successful as a sculptor, in 1873 he was invited to Lwów (then in Austro-Hungarian Galicia) to become a professor at the Technical Academy, predecessor of the Lviv Polytechnic.

He died in Lviv on 1 April 1899 and is interred at Lychakiv Cemetery.

Gallery

See also
Enrico Marconi

References

Polish sculptors
Polish male sculptors
1835 births
1899 deaths
Artists from Warsaw
Polish people of Italian descent
Academy of Fine Arts in Warsaw alumni
19th-century sculptors